Yae or Yæ (Ԙ ԙ; italics: Ԙ ԙ) is a letter of the Cyrillic script, a ligature of Я (Ya) and Е (E); я and е.

Computing codes

See also
Cyrillic characters in Unicode

References

tt:Ԕ